Rokėnai is a village in Zarasai district municipality, Lithuania. According to 2011 census, the population of Rokėnai was 95.
Composer Juozas Gruodis was born in Rokėnai.

References

Villages in Utena County